Carlos Danito Parruque (born 5 June 1983) is Mozambican footballer. He plays for Clube Ferroviário de Maputo as a midfielder. He was called to Mozambique national football team at the 2010 Africa Cup of Nations.

References

External links 

1983 births
Living people
Association football midfielders
Mozambican footballers
Mozambique international footballers
Clube Ferroviário de Maputo footballers
CD Chingale players
GD Maputo players
SC Nampula players
2010 Africa Cup of Nations players
Sportspeople from Maputo